X Raisons is the second album from the French hip-hop group Saian Supa Crew, released in 2001. The album's international version was promoted by Roots Manuva and Brand Nubian.

Track listing

References

2001 albums
Saïan Supa Crew albums